Robert Tate (born 1973) is a former American football player.

Robert Tate may also refer to:

Robert Tate, Sheriff of London in 1482 and 1486
Robert Ward Tate (1864–1938), New Zealand civil administrator of Samoa (then Western Samoa)
Robert Tate, American geomagnetist and seismologist after whom the Tate Glacier was named in 1964

See also
Robert Tait (disambiguation)